Ryan and Kyle Pepi (born August 2, 1993, in North Attleboro, Massachusetts) are American twin child actors. In 1995, they had a recurring role on the soap opera Another World, playing "Kirkland Harrison". In 1999, they played the character "Jackie Dunphy" in the movie Outside Providence. The twins also shared credits for guest roles on episodes of the television series MADtv in 1999, The X-Files in 2000, ER in 2001, and Robbery Homicide Division in 2002. Ryan and Kyle also worked on commercials for products such as Ford Windstar, Papa Gino's, Playskool, Milton Bradley, Kids Town, Family Fun Magazine, and Parents Magazine.

In 2011, Kyle Christopher Pepi and Ryan David Pepi graduated from Mansfield High School in Mansfield, Massachusetts.

References

1993 births
Living people
American male child actors
American male television actors
Identical twin male actors
People from North Attleborough, Massachusetts
American twins
Male actors from Massachusetts
Mansfield High School alumni